The Shropshire Star is reputedly the twelfth biggest-selling regional newspaper in the UK. It is based at Grosvenor House, Telford where it covers the whole of Shropshire plus parts of Herefordshire, Worcestershire, Staffordshire, Cheshire and Mid Wales. It is printed by Newsquest at their Deeside office.

Currently edited by Martin Wright, the Shropshire Star publishes one edition on Monday through Saturday. In the first half of 2012, the newspaper had a daily circulation of 49,751 but ten years later paid print circulation had declined by more than three quarters to 10,395 (July-Dec 2022).

The Shropshire Star has been under the continuous ownership of the Graham/Meier family almost since its inception. The family controls the publication through their equity stake in Midland News Association (MNA), which also owns the Express & Star newspaper.

History

The Shropshire Star has been in circulation since Monday 5 October 1964, inheriting a nightly circulation of around 19,000 from the old Shropshire edition of the Express & Star.

The Midland News Association board saw an opportunity with the growth of Dawley New Town - later renamed Telford - and produced a successful news and advertising product to serve a county which is a mixture of agriculture and industrial areas.

The Shropshire Star later became the first evening newspaper in Europe to use web-fed offset printing, which refers to the use of rolls (or webs) of paper supplied to the printing press.

Online media
The Shropshire Star publishes breaking news and sport content online each day, in addition to regular blogs and unique video content. Its website, shropshirestar.com, was launched in 1997.

A Shropshire Star App for iPad and iPhone was launched in January 2012, using page-turning technology to mimic the look and feel of the actual newspaper.

August 2012 saw the website re-launched in a responsive web design alongside its sister title expressandstar.com – believed to be the first of any other regional newspaper websites in the UK. The website also offers free access to the weekly Chronicle and Journal series.

By 2015, the term Shropshire Star was being inputted into search engines more than 200,000 times per calendar month, which made it the most popular search string with the word Shropshire in the request.

Editors

 Keith Parker (1972–1977)
 Robert Jones (1977–1991)
 Warren Wilson (1992–1994)
 Andy Wright (1994–1998)
 Adrian Faber (1998–2001) 
 Sarah-Jane Smith (2001–2011)
 Keith Harrison (2011–2013)
 Martin Wright (2013–present)

Notable journalists
Jeremy Clarkson - wrote his first motoring articles for this paper. He recalled: "I started small, on the Shropshire Star with little Peugeots and Fiats and worked my way up to Ford Granadas and Rovers, until, after about seven years, I was allowed to drive an Aston Martin Lagonda."

Editions
 Three different editions: Telford (Last), Shrewsbury, and rural Shropshire and Mid Wales.

See also
Midland News Association
Express and Star
North Shropshire Chronicle
Shrewsbury Chronicle

References

External links

Newspapers published in Shropshire
Mass media in Shropshire
Publications established in 1964
1964 establishments in England
Daily newspapers published in the United Kingdom